Simona Krupeckaitė (born 13 December 1982) is a Lithuanian former professional track cyclist. She is the 2009 500 m Time Trial World Champion and World Record holder at 33.296s, and the 2010 Keirin World Champion. She also won the 2009, 2010 and 2016 Lithuanian Sportsperson of the Year award. In 2010 Krupeckaitė reached one more world record. This time she achieved 10.793 s record at Flying 200 m time trial event. She retired from competition after the conclusion of the 2021 UCI Track Champions League in December of that year.

Career results

2003
2nd 500 m TT, European Track Championships, U23
2nd Sprint, European Track Championships, U23

2004
3rd 500 m TT, UCI Track Cycling World Championships
2004 UCI Track Cycling World Cup Classics
1st Keirin, Round 2, Aguascalientes
3rd Sprint, Round 2, Aguascalientes

2005
2005–2006 UCI Track Cycling World Cup Classics
2nd 500 m TT, Round 1, Moscow

2006
2006–2007 UCI Track Cycling World Cup Classics
2nd 500 m TT, Round 1, Sydney
3rd Sprint, Round 2, Moscow
3rd 500 m TT, Round 2, Moscow

2007
2007–2008 UCI Track Cycling World Cup Classics
2nd 500 m TT, Round 2, Beijing

2008
2nd 500 m TT, UCI Track Cycling World Championships
2nd Sprint, UCI Track Cycling World Championships
2007–2008 UCI Track Cycling World Cup Classics
3rd 500 m TT, Round 3, Los Angeles

2008–2009 UCI Track Cycling World Cup Classics
1st Sprint, Round 3, Cali
1st 500 m TT, Round 3, Cali
1st Keirin, Round 3, Cali
3rd Team Sprint, Round 3, Cali

2009
1st 500 m TT, UCI Track Cycling World Championships, set new World Record
3rd Sprint, UCI Track Cycling World Championships
3rd Team Sprint, UCI Track Cycling World Championships

2008–2009 UCI Track Cycling World Cup Classics
1st 500 m TT, Round 4, Beijing
1st Sprint, Round 4, Beijing
1st Keirin, Round 4, Beijing
2nd Team Sprint, Round 4, Beijing
2009–2010 UCI Track Cycling World Cup Classics
1st Keirin, Round 1, Manchester
3rd Sprint, Round 1, Manchester
1st 500m TT, Round 3, Cali
1st Sprint, Round 3, Cali
2nd Team Sprint, Round 3, Cali

2010
1st Keirin, UCI Track Cycling World Championships
2nd 500 m TT, UCI Track Cycling World Championships
3rd Sprint, UCI Track Cycling World Championships
3rd Team Sprint, UCI Track Cycling World Championships

2011
2nd Sprint, World Track Championships
2010–2011 UCI Track Cycling World Cup Classics
2nd Sprint, Round 3, Beijing
3rd Team Sprint, Round 3, Beijing
2011–2012 UCI Track Cycling World Cup Classics
1st Keirin, Round 2, Cali

2012
2nd Sprint, UCI Track Cycling World Championships
2011–2012 UCI Track Cycling World Cup Classics
2nd Team Sprint, Round 3, Beijing
2nd Sprint, Round 3, Beijing
2nd Keirin, Round 3, Beijing
1st Keirin, Round 4, London
2014
Polish Cup
1st Keirin
1st Sprint
1st Keirin, Grand Prix of Tula
1st Keirin, Japan Track Cup 1
Japan Track Cup 2
1st Keirin
3rd Sprint
2nd Sprint, Panevezys
Memorial of Alexander Lesnikov
3rd Keirin
3rd Sprint
2015
Panevezys
1st Keirin
1st Sprint
Cottbuser SprintCup
1st Keirin
1st Sprint
Grand Prix of Poland
1st Keirin
1st Sprint
1st Team Sprint (with Migle Marozaite)
2nd Keirin, Oberhausen
2015–16 UCI Track Cycling World Cup
3rd Sprint, Round 2, Cambridge

2016
2015–16 UCI Track Cycling World Cup
1st Keirin, Round 3, Hong Kong
2016–17 UCI Track Cycling World Cup
1st Keirin, Round 1, Glasgow
1st Sprint, Round 1, Glasgow
1st Sprint, Grand Prix of Poland
Panevežys
1st Keirin
1st Sprint
Memorial of Alexander Lesnikov
1st Keirin
1st Sprint
Grand Prix of Tula
1st Keirin
1st Sprint
Grand Prix Minsk
1st Sprint
2nd Keirin
2nd Keirin, Oberhausen

2017
International track race – Panevežys
1st Keirin
1st Sprint
2nd Keirin, UEC European Track Championships
2nd Keirin, Troféu Internacional de Anadia

References

External links

Official Simona Krupeckaite website

1982 births
Living people
Lithuanian female cyclists
Cyclists at the 2004 Summer Olympics
Cyclists at the 2008 Summer Olympics
Cyclists at the 2012 Summer Olympics
Cyclists at the 2016 Summer Olympics
Cyclists at the 2020 Summer Olympics
Olympic cyclists of Lithuania
UCI Track Cycling World Champions (women)
People from Utena
Lithuanian Sportsperson of the Year winners
Lithuanian track cyclists
Cyclists at the 2019 European Games
European Games medalists in cycling
European Games gold medalists for Lithuania
European Games silver medalists for Lithuania